Hospital Clínic is a station in the Barcelona Metro network, named after the Hospital Clínic i Provincial de Barcelona which lies in its immediate vicinity, in the Eixample district of Barcelona. It serves  line 5.

The station, which opened in 1969, is part of the central section of L5. It is located under Carrer Rosselló, between Carrer del Comte d'Urgell and Carrer de Villarroel.

Services

External links

Hospital Clínic at Trenscat.com

Railway stations in Spain opened in 1969
Barcelona Metro line 5 stations